St. Peter and St. Paul's Church, and variations using Saint or Saints or other, may refer to one of many churches dedicated to the apostles Saint Peter and Saint Paul around the world, including:

Armenia
 Saint Paul and Peter Church, Yerevan (destroyed in the 1930s)

Belarus
 Saints Peter and Paul Church, Iwye

Belgium
 Sint-Petrus-en-Pauluskerk, Ostend

Bosnia and Herzegovina
 Saints Peter and Paul Church, Livno

Bulgaria
 Church of Saints Peter and Paul, Nikopol

Canada
 Saints Peter and Paul Melkite Catholic Church, in Ottawa
 St. Peter & St. Paul's Anglican Church (Ottawa)

Croatia
 Church of St Peter and St Paul, Osijek, co-cathedral of the Roman Catholic Archdiocese of Đakovo-Osijek
 Church of the Holy Apostles Peter and Paul, Štikada, Serbian Orthodox Church

Cyprus (TRNC)
 Church of St. Peter and St. Paul of Famagusta, now a cafe and bar

Czech Republic
 Basilica of St. Peter and St. Paul, Prague
 Cathedral of St. Peter and Paul, Brno

Egypt
 St. Peter and St. Paul's Church, Cairo

Estonia
 St. Peter and St. Paul's Church, Kaarma
 St. Peter and St. Paul's Cathedral, Tallinn

France
 Church of St. Peter and St. Paul (Montreuil, Seine-Saint-Denis)
 Église Saint-Pierre-et-Saint-Paul, Neuwiller-lès-Saverne
 St. Peter and St. Paul's Church, Wissembourg

Germany
 St. Peter and Paul Cathedral, Brandenburg
 Ss. Peter and Paul, Wannsee in Berlin
 St. Peter und Paul, Weimar

India 

 St. Peter and St. Paul's Church, Parumala
 St. Peter and St. Paul's Church, Kolenchery

Ireland
 Saints Peter and Paul's Church, Cork
 St Peter and St Paul Cathedral, Ennis, County Clare

Israel
 St. Peter and St. Paul Church, Shefa-Amr

Italy
 Church of St. Peter and Paul, Arese
 St. Peter and St. Paul's Church, Brebbia
 Santi Pietro e Paolo, Buonconvento
 Santi Pietro e Paolo d'Agrò, Casalvecchio Siculo
 San Pietro Caveoso, Matera
 Santi Pietro e Paolo, Siena

Lithuania
 St. Peter and St. Paul's Church, Panevėžys
 St. Peter and St. Paul's Church, Vilnius

Philippines
 Saints Peter and Paul Parish Church (Calasiao), Pangasinan
 Sts. Peter and Paul Parish Church (Makati)
 Saints Peter and Paul Parish Church (Siniloan), Laguna

Poland
 Saints Peter and Paul Church, Brzeg
 Saints Peter and Paul Church, Kraków
 St. Peter and Paul-Collegiate in Kruszwica, Kuyavian-Pomeranian Voivodship
 Church of St. Peter and St. Paul, Pabianice
 Archcathedral Basilica of St. Peter and St. Paul, Poznań

Romania
 Cathedral of Saints Peter and Paul, Constanța
 Saints Peter and Paul Church, Pitești
 Saints Peter and Paul Church, Târgu Jiu

Russia
 Saints Peter and Paul Cathedral, Saint Petersburg

Serbia
 Church of the Holy Apostles Peter and Paul, Ras, an early Christian church
 Church of the Holy Apostles Peter and Paul, Topčider

Singapore
 Church of Saints Peter and Paul, Singapore

Switzerland
 Church of St. Peter and Paul, Bern

Turkey
 Church of SS Peter and Paul, Istanbul
 Saint Paul's Church, Tarsus
 Saint Paul Church, Adana

United Kingdom  
 Old St Peter and St Paul's Church, Albury, Surrey
 Church of SS Peter & Paul, Aston, Birmingham
 Church of St Peter and St Paul, Barnby Dun, Barnby Dun, South Yorkshire
 Bath Abbey, also known as the Abbey Church of St Peter and St Paul, Somerset
 Church of St Peter & St Paul, Bleadon, Somerset
 St Peter and St Paul, Bristol
 St Peter and St Paul, Bromley, Kent (now London)
 St Peter and St Paul, Buckingham, Buckinghamshire
 St. Peter & Paul Church, Wingrave, Buckinghamshire
 Abbey of St. Peter and Paul, Canterbury, Kent
 Church of St Peter and St Paul, Chaldon, Surrey
 Church of St Peter & St Paul, Churchstanton, Somerset
 Church of St Peter and St Paul, Coleshill, Warwickshire
 Church of St Peter & St Paul, Cranfield, Bedfordshire
 St Peter and St Paul's Church, Eckington, Derbyshire
 St Peter and St Paul, Dagenham, Essex (now London)
 Church of St Peter & St Paul, Flitwick, Bedfordshire
 Church of St Peter and St Paul, Great Missenden, Buckinghamshire
 St Peter & St Paul's Church, Gringley-on-the-Hill, Nottinghamshire
 Church of St Peter & St Paul, Godalming, Surrey
 Church of St Peter and St Paul, Heytesbury, Wiltshire
 St Peter and St Paul Church, Kimpton, Hertfordshire
 Church of St Peter & St Paul, Kingsbury, Warwickshire
 St Peter and St Paul's Church, Lavenham, Suffolk
 St Peter and St Paul's Church, Lingfield, Surrey
 St Peter and St Paul's Church, Mansfield, Nottinghamshire
 St Peter and St Paul's Church, Mottistone, Isle of Wight
 Church of St Peter and St Paul, Ormskirk, Lancashire
 Church of St Peter and St Paul, Over Stowey, Somerset
 Church of Saints Peter and Paul, Olney, City of Milton Keynes, Buckinghamshire
 St Peter and St Paul's Church, Preston Deanery, Northamptonshire
 Church of St Peter and St Paul, Rock, Worcestershire
 Church of St Peter and St Paul, Shepton Mallet, Somerset
Church of St Peter and St Paul, Stainton, Middlesbrough
 Sts. Peter and Paul Church, Stallingborough, Lincolnshire
 St Peter and St Paul's Church, Sturton-le-Steeple, Nottinghamshire
 Cathedral Church of St Peter and St Paul, Sheffield
 Church of St Peter and St Paul, Tring, Hertfordshire
 Church of St Peter and St Paul, Trottiscliffe, Kent
 Church of St Peter and St Paul, Wantage
 St Peter & St Paul's double monastery, Wearmouth & Jarrow in County Durham
 St Peter and St Paul's Church, Wisbech
 St Peter and St Paul's Church, Wolverhampton, West Midlands
 St Peter and St Paul's Church, Weobley, Weobley

United States
(by state)
 Sts. Peter and Paul Church (St. Paul Island, Alaska), NRHP-listed
 Saints Peter and Paul Church, San Francisco, California
 Sts. Peter & Paul Catholic Church (Miami, Florida)
 Saints Peter and Paul Catholic Church (Honolulu), Hawaii
 Saints Peter and Paul Cathedral (Indianapolis)
 Saints Peter and Paul Roman Catholic Church (Harper, Iowa), NRHP-listed
 Saints Peter and Paul Church (Petersburg, Iowa), NRHP-listed
 Saints Peter and Paul Catholic Church (Pocahontas, Iowa), NRHP-listed
 Saints Peter and Paul Catholic Church (Sherrill, Iowa), in Dubuque County, Iowa
 Saints Peter and Paul Catholic Church (Solon, Iowa), NRHP-listed
 Basilica of Saints Peter and Paul (Lewiston, Maine), NRHP-listed
 Saints Peter and Paul Jesuit Church, Detroit, Michigan, NRHP-listed
 Saints Peter and Paul Academy, Detroit, Michigan, NRHP-listed
 Sts. Peter and Paul Russian Orthodox Church, Bramble, Minnesota, NRHP-listed
 Saints Peter and Paul Church (Chisholm, Minnesota), NRHP-listed
 Saints Peter and Paul Church (Gilman, Minnesota), NRHP-listed
 Saints Peter and Paul Catholic Church Complex (Bow Valley, Nebraska), NRHP-listed
 Ss. Peter and Paul Church, Williamsville, New York, NRHP-listed
 Saints Peter and Paul Church (New Hradec, North Dakota), NRHP-listed
 Old Saints Peter and Paul Cemetery, Wrought-Iron Cross Site, Karlsruhe, North Dakota, NRHP-listed
 Saints Peter and Paul Catholic Church Complex (Strasburg, North Dakota), NRHP-listed
 Saints Peter and Paul Catholic Church (Sandusky, Ohio), Sandusky, Ohio, NRHP-listed
 Saint Peter and Saint Paul Historic District, Toledo, Ohio, listed on the NRHP in Lucas County, Ohio
 Cathedral Basilica of Saints Peter and Paul (Philadelphia), Pennsylvania, NRHP-listed
 Saints Peter and Paul Church (Pittsburgh), Pennsylvania
 Cathedral of Saints Peter and Paul (Providence, Rhode Island), listed on the NRHP in Rhode Island
 Saints Peter and Paul Basilica, Chattanooga, Tennessee, NRHP-listed
 Saints Peter and Paul Cathedral (St. Thomas, U.S. Virgin Islands)
 Saints Peter and Paul Roman Catholic Church Complex, Milwaukee, Wisconsin, NRHP-listed

See also 
 Saints Peter and Paul Catholic Church (disambiguation)
 Cathedral of Saints Peter and Paul (disambiguation)

Church